Japan Institute for Promotion of Digital Economy and Community (JIPDEC or 日本情報処理開発協会 in Japanese) is a nonprofit foundation for development of key IT technologies and policies, as related to the Ministry of Internal Affairs and Communications and Ministry of Economy, Trade and Industry (METI). The promotion of information processing by computers is JIPDEC's objective.

General information 
The JIPDEC was established on 20 December 1967 as ″Japan Information Processing Development Corporation″. The Japan Computer Usage Development Institute (CUDI) and the Institute of Information Technology (IIT) were incorporated into JIPDEC in April 1976. In April 2011 the JIPDEC became a general incorporated foundation governed by the ″Act on Authorization of Public Interest Incorporated Associations and Public Interest Incorporated Foundations″. The organization was renamed to ″Japan Institute for Promotion of Digital Economy and Community (JIPDEC)″.

The JIPDEC is known for their contributions to security and privacy issues. The JIPDEC is part of the accreditation process for the certification of several management systems. Based on the ″Act on the Protection of Personal Information (APPI)″ of 2005 the PrivacyMark System helps private enterprises to fulfill the compliance with Japanese Industrial Standards JIS Q 15001:2006 Personal Information Protection Management System - Requirements on Personal Information Protection Management Systems (PMS). Other management systems like ISO/IEC 27001-based JIS Q 27001 Information Security Management Systems (ISMS), ISO/IEC 20000-based Information Technology Service Management Systems (ITSMS) and Business Continuity Management Systems (BCMS) can show compliance with further legislative acts. Furthermore, the JIPDEC has developed and is ″developing new mechanisms for the use of electronic information″.

See also 

For the IT related organizations and consortiums in Japan, see:
 Japan Information Industry Association (JISA) 
 Computer Entertainment Suppliers' Association (CESA)
 Japan Users Association of Information Systems
 Japan Telemarketing Association (JTA)
 Japan Data Center Council
 JEIDA (Japan Electronic Industries Development Association)

References

External links 
 JIPDEC homepage
 PrivacyMark System homepage

Economy of Japan
Non-profit organizations based in Japan
Information technology organizations based in Asia